Petasina subtecta is a species of air-breathing land snail, a terrestrial pulmonate gastropod mollusk in the family Hygromiidae, the hairy snails and their allies. This species is endemic to Austria.

References

Petasina
Endemic fauna of Austria
Gastropods described in 1929
Taxonomy articles created by Polbot